Stearoylethanolamide (SEA) is an endocannabinoid neurotransmitter.

Stearoylethanolamide (C20H41NO2; 18:0), also called N-(octadecanoyl)ethanolamine, is an N-acylethanolamine and the ethanolamide of octadecanoic acid (C18H36O2; 18:0) and ethanolamine (MEA: C2H7NO), and functionally related to an octadecanoic acid.

Levels of SEA correlate with changes in pain intensity, indicating this SEA change, reflect the pain reduction effects of IPRP.

References

Endocannabinoids
Neurotransmitters
Fatty acid amides